Belmont Historic District is a national historic district located at Belmont, Gaston County, North Carolina.  It encompasses 264 contributing buildings, 1 contributing site, and 2 contributing structures in the central business district and adjacent residential areas of Belmont. The district was developed after 1873, and includes notable examples of Colonial Revival, Tudor Revival, and Bungalow / American Craftsman architecture. Located in the district is the separately listed U.S. Post Office, Former.  Other notable buildings include the R.L. Stowe Mills Office Building, Bank of Belmont (1926), Piedmont and Northern Railroad Depot (c. 1915), Belmont Hotel (c. 1907), Abel C. Lineberger House No. 2 (c. 1919) designed by Charles Christian Hook (1870–1938), Samuel Pinckney Stowe House (c. 1919), James W. Stowe House (c. 1910), Sacred Heart College, and Belmont High School (1939).

It was listed on the National Register of Historic Places in 1996.

Gallery

References

Historic districts on the National Register of Historic Places in North Carolina
Colonial Revival architecture in North Carolina
Tudor Revival architecture in North Carolina
Buildings and structures in Gaston County, North Carolina
National Register of Historic Places in Gaston County, North Carolina